Buddha's Birthday (also known as Buddha Jayanti, also known as his day of enlightenment – Buddha Purnima, Buddha Pournami) is a Buddhist festival that is celebrated in most of East Asia and South Asia commemorating the birth of the Prince Siddhartha Gautama, later the Gautama Buddha, who was the founder of Buddhism. According to Buddhist tradition, Gautama Buddha was born c. 563–483 BCE in Lumbini, Nepal. Archaeologists from Durham University working in Nepal have uncovered evidence of a structure at the birthplace of the Buddha dating to the sixth century B.C. using a combination of radiocarbon and optically stimulated luminescence techniques 

The exact date of Buddha's birthday is based on the Asian lunisolar calendars. The date for the celebration of Buddha's birthday varies from year to year in the Western Gregorian calendar, but usually falls in April or May. In leap years it may be celebrated in June.

In South and Southeast Asia, the Buddha's birth is celebrated as part of Vesak, a festival that also celebrates the Buddha's enlightenment (on the day of the full moon) and death. In East Asia, Vietnam and the Philippines, the awakening and death of the Buddha are observed as separate holidays.

Date

The exact date of Buddha's Birthday is based on the Asian lunisolar calendars and is primarily celebrated in Baisakh month of the Buddhist calendar and the Bikram Sambat Hindu calendar. This is the reason behind the term Vesak. In modern-day India and Nepal, where the Historical Buddha lived, it is celebrated on the full moon day of the Vaisakha month of the Buddhist calendar. In Theravada countries following the Buddhist calendar, it falls on the full moon, Uposatha day, typically in the 5th or 6th lunar month. In China, Korea, Vietnam and the Philippines, it is celebrated on the eighth day of the fourth month in the Chinese lunar calendar. The date varies from year to year in the Western Gregorian calendar but usually falls in April or May. In leap years it may be celebrated in June. In Tibet, it falls on the 7th day of the fourth month of the Tibetan calendar.

South and Southeast Asia and Mongolia

In South Asian and Southeast Asian countries (except Vietnam and the Philippines) as well as Mongolia, Buddha's birthday is celebrated on the full moon day of the Vaisakha month of the Buddhist calendar and the Hindu calendar, which usually falls in April or May of the Western Gregorian calendar. The festival is known as Buddha Purnima, as Purnima means full moon day in Sanskrit. It is also called Buddha Jayanti, with Jayanti meaning birthday in Sanskrit.

The corresponding Western Gregorian calendar dates varies from year to year:
 2020: May 7
 2021: May 19 (Bangladesh, Bhutan, Cambodia, Myanmar, Sri Lanka, Thailand and Tibet), May 26 (India, Indonesia, Nepal, Malaysia and Singapore)

East Asia, Vietnam and the Philippines
In many East Asian countries as well as Vietnam and the Philippines, Buddha's Birth is celebrated on the 8th day of the 4th month in the Chinese lunar calendar (in Japan since 1873 on April 8 of the Gregorian calendar), and the day is an official holiday in Hong Kong, Macau and South Korea. The date falls from the end of April to the end of May according to the Gregorian calendar.

The primarily solar Gregorian calendar date varies from year to year, and in the year 2021, it was on May 19.

Taiwan
In 1999 the Taiwanese government set Buddha's birthday as the second Sunday of May, the same date as Mother's Day.

Japan
As a result of the Meiji Restoration, Japan adopted the Gregorian calendar in lieu of the Chinese lunar calendar in 1873. However, it took approximately until 1945, the end of World War II, for religious festivities to adopt the new calendar. In most Japanese temples, Buddha's birth is now celebrated on the Gregorian and buddhist calendar date April 8; only a few (mainly in Okinawa) celebrate it on the orthodox Chinese calendar date of the eighth day of the fourth lunar month.

Celebrations in each country

Asia

Bangladesh
Buddha's birthday is a public holiday in Bangladesh and the event is called Buddho Purnima(বুদ্ধ পূর্ণিমা). On the days preceding Purnima, Buddhist monks and priests decorate Buddhist temples with colourful decorations and candles. On the day of the festival, the President and Prime Minister deliver speeches addressing the history and importance of Buddhism, and of religious harmony in the country. From noon onwards large fairs are held in and around the temples and viharas, selling Bengali food (largely vegetarian), clothes, and toys. Performances of Buddha's life are also presented. Buddhist monks teach celebrants about the Dharma and the Five Precepts (panchashila). Buddhists then attend a congression inside the monastery where the chief monk delivers a speech discussing the Buddha and the Three Jewels (tri-ratna), and about living the ideal life. Afterwards, a prayer to the Buddha is offered, and people then light candles and recite the Three Jewels and Five Precepts.

Bhutan
In Bhutan, Buddha Parinirvana is a national holiday and is also celebrated as Saga Dawa on the 15th day of the Saga Dawa (fourth month of the Tibetan calendar). Observation of the holy month begins from 1st day of the Saga Dawa, Vesak Month that culminates on the full moon day 15th of the month with celebrations of three holy events of Buddha's life; birth, enlightenment and Death (Mahaparinirvana). Throughout the Saga Dawa Vesak Month holy, virtuous and morally ethical activities flows in homes, temples, monasteries and public places. Devotees and followers follow strict vegetarian meals throughout the Saga Dawa  month and avoid consumption of any non-vegetarian food. The Buddha parinirvana day also sees devotees visiting monastery to offer prayers and light butter lamps. People of various walk of life wear their national dress and go to monasteries to receive blessings from their guardian deity.

Cambodia
In Cambodia, Buddha's Birthday is celebrated as Visak Bochea and is a public holiday where monks around the country carry the Buddhist flag, lotus flowers, incense, and candles to acknowledge Vesak. People also take part in alms-giving to the monks.

China
In China, this day is generally and commonly called in Chinese, 佛誕 (Fódàn), but also called "Yùfú Jié (浴佛節, "Bathing (Purifying) Buddha Festival"), Guànfó Huì (灌佛會, "Pouring on the Buddha Congregational Assembly"), Lóng-huá Huì (龍華會), Huáyán Huì (華嚴會)" or even " 衛塞節 (Wèisāi jié, "Vesak Day), 偉大的衛塞節花節偉大的滿月 (Wěidà de Wèisāi-jié Huā-jié Wěidà de Mǎnyuè, "Great Vesak Day Flower Festival Full Moon of Flower Moon")". Celebrations may occur in Buddhist temples where people may light incense and bring food offerings for the monks.

Hong Kong
In Hong Kong, Buddha's birthday is a public holiday. Lanterns are lit to symbolise the Buddha's enlightenment and many people visit the temple to pay their respects. The bathing of statues of the Buddha is a major feature of Buddha's birthday celebrations in the city. In Macau, All Buddhist temples in Macau will hold the "Lóng-huá Huì (龍華會)" ritual ceremony, bathing the Buddha with "Wǔ Xiāng-Shuǐ (五香水 "Five Scented-Perfumed Water")", which the festival is also a public holiday in Macau.

India
The public holiday for Buddha Purnima in India was initiated by B. R. Ambedkar when he was the minister of law and justice. It is celebrated especially in Sikkim, Ladakh, Arunachal Pradesh, Bodh Gaya, Lahaul and Spiti district, Kinnaur, various parts of North Bengal such as Kalimpong, Darjeeling, and Kurseong, and Maharashtra (where 77% of total Indian Buddhists live), as well as other parts of India as per Indian calendar. Buddhists go to common Viharas to observe a rather longer-than-usual, full-length Buddhist sutra, akin to a service.

In the followers of Theravada style the dress code is pure white, others don't follow particular dress code. Kheer, sweet rice porridge is commonly served to recall the story of Sujata, a maiden who, in Gautama Buddha's life, offered the Buddha a bowl of milk porridge. Informally called "Buddha's Birthday," it actually commemorates the birth, enlightenment (nirvāna), and death (Parinirvāna) of Gautama Buddha in the Theravada tradition.

At the Mahabodhi Temple of Bodhgaya in India, Buddha Purnima is celebrated with great enthusiasm. This temple gets decorated with colored decorations. At the Bodhi Tree, under which Gautama Buddha obtained enlightenment, devotees of Gautam Buddha do special prayers. At the National Museum in Delhi, Lord Buddha’s holy remaining's are open for public viewing.

Tibetans in exile and Tibet celebrate holy Vesak day Saga Dawa on the 15th day of the Saga Dawa (fourth month of the Tibetan calendar). Observation of the holy month begins from 1st day of the Saga Dawa, Vesak Month that culminates on the full moon day 15th of the month with celebrations of three holy events of Buddha's life; birth, enlightenment and Death (Mahaparinirvana). Throughout the Saga Dawa Vesak Month holy, virtuous and morally ethical activities flows in homes, temples, monasteries and public places. Devotees and followers take special precepts Mahayana Posadha during the holy month and especially on the full moon day, therefore consumption of semi-vegetarian or Non-vegetarian food is avoided during the holy month of Vesak Saga Dawa in Tibetan and Himalayan villages and communities. Yogis also choose to do special types of meditation on this day as it is said to be quite conducive for spiritual growth.

Indonesia
In Indonesia, Buddha's Birthday is celebrated as Waisak and is a public holiday. A large procession beginning in Mendut in Java, and ends at Borobudur – the largest Buddhist temple in the world.

Japan

In Japan, Buddha's Birthday is known as  Kanbutsu-e or Hanamatsuri (Flower Festival) and is held on April 8. Buddha's birth is also celebrated according to the Buddhist calendar but is not a national holiday. On this day, all temples hold 降誕会 (Gōtan-e), 仏生会 (Busshō-e), 浴仏会 (Yokubutsu-e), 龍華会 (Ryūge-e) and 花会式 (Hana-eshiki). Japanese people pour ama-cha (a beverage prepared from Hydrangea serrata, a variety of hydrangea) on small Buddha statues decorated with flowers, as if bathing a newborn baby. The tradition of bathing the Buddha originated in China and was introduced to Japan where it was first held in Nara in 606. Lion dancing is also a major tradition practiced during Buddha's Birthday and has become associated with the festival in Japan.

Malaysia
In Malaysia, Buddha's Birthday is celebrated as Wesak Day and is a public holiday celebrated by the sizeable minority Buddhist population in the country. Temples across the country are decorated, and caged animals are set free. People engage in prayers, chanting, and alms-giving across the country.

Mongolia
In Mongolia, Buddha's Birthday is called (Mongolian Cyrillic: Багшийн Их Дүйцэн Өдөр, Burkhan Bagshiin Ikh Düitsen Ödör, "Lord Buddha's Great Festival Day"), is celebrated as "Ikh Duichen" and its date is determined by the Mongolian lunar calendar. As a result, the date falls in line with celebrations of Buddha's Birthday/Vesak in South and Southeast Asian countries as opposed to neighbouring East Asian countries. In December 2019, the popularly celebrated festival by many Mongolian Buddhists, is made a public holiday.

Myanmar
In Myanmar, Buddha's Birthday is celebrated as Full Moon of Kasun and is a public holiday. It is celebrated by watering the Bodhi tree and chanting. In large pagodas, music and dance is also performed as part of the celebrations.

Nepal

In Nepal, Buddha's birthday is celebrated on the full moon day of May. The festival is known by various names, Buddha Jayanti, Buddha Purnima, Vaishakh Purnima, Saga Dawa, and Vesak. Purnima means full moon day in Sanskrit. Among the Newars of Nepal, especially from the Shakya clan of Newars, it is of great importance because they consider it as a continuation of the sage of the Śākyas- the clan that Lord Buddha's family belonged to. Thus, they celebrate the festival which is in their language known as Swānyā Punhi (स्वांया पुन्हि), the full moon day of flowers. The day marks not just the birth of Shakyamuni Gautama Buddha, but also the day of his Enlightenment and Mahaparinirvana.

The event is celebrated by gentle and serene fervour, keeping in mind the very nature of Buddhism. People, especially women, go to common Viharas to observe a rather longer-than-usual, full-length Buddhist sutra, something like a service. The usual dress is pure white. Non-vegetarian food is normally avoided. Kheer, sweet rice porridge is commonly served to recall the story of Sujata, a maiden who offered the Buddha a bowl of milk porridge.

Buddha Purnima is the biggest day for Buddhists because on this day, it is believed three important events of the Buddha's life took place: his birth, his attaining enlightenment, and his death, Paranirvana. This day is known as Thrice Blessed Festival.

North Korea
Buddha's Birthday is occasionally designated as a public holiday in North Korea and is known as Chopail ( Chopa-il; Hanja: 初八日, "the first 8th day (of the month in the Lunar Calendar)"). Designation of traditional Korean holidays as public holidays in North Korea are determined by the Cabinet a few days before the traditional holiday begins. Buddha's Birthday is a traditional festival in Korean culture, and was celebrated in Korea long before the division of the country. As a result, the festival is still celebrated in North Korea by the country's Buddhist population.

Philippines
In the Philippines, Buddha's Birthday is known as Kaarawan ni Buddha and usually has Chinese elements via its Chinese community. It is not a public holiday as most Filipinos are Christian. However, it can be celebrated by people of all religions. Like in China and Japan, Filipino people bathe statues of the Buddha.

Singapore
In Singapore, Buddha's birthday is celebrated as Vesak or Vesak Day and is a public holiday in the country. Buddhist temples hold celebrations and are decorated with Buddhist flags and flowers. Devotees also bring offerings to the temples.

South Korea

In South Korea, the birthday of Buddha is celebrated according to the Korean lunar calendar and is a national holiday. This day is called "Bucheo-nim o-shin nal"  meaning "the day when the Buddha (Bucheo-nim) came", which is also called "Seok-ga T'an-shin-il" (Hangul: 석가탄신일, Hanja: 釋迦誕辰日), i.e. "the Birthday of Sakyamuni Buddha" and sometimes also called Chopail ( Chopa-il; Hanja: 初八日, "the first 8th day (of the month in the Lunar Calendar)"). Lotus lanterns hang in temples throughout the month and lanterns are hung in homes and in the streets. On the day of Buddha's birth, many temples provide free meals and tea to all visitors and organise large lantern festival called Yeondeunghoe (Hangul: 연등회, Hanja: 燃燈會, "Lotus Lantern Festival"). Breakfast and lunch are also provided, which often includes sanchae bibimbap. Buddha's Birthday is a popular holiday and folk celebration in Korea, and is often celebrated by people of all religious faiths.

Sri Lanka

In Sri Lanka, Buddha's Birthday is celebrated as Vesak and is a public holiday celebrated on the first full moon day of the month of May. Its date is determined by the Buddhist lunar calendar. People engage in religious observances and decorate houses and streets with candles and paper lanterns as well as bamboo-framed lanterns. Dansalas is practised and refers to the free offering of food and drink to people. Devotional songs known as Bakthi Gee are sung, and decorative gateways called pandols are erected throughout the country. Temples around the country also hold celebrations, and devotees bring offerings and burn incense. Electric light displays that depict stories from the Buddha's life are also a notable part of Vesak celebrations in the country.

Taiwan
In Taiwan, after the initiation by the Buddhists and the general public, the "Guódìng Fúdàn Jié (Chinese: 國定佛誕節, "National Buddha's Birthday")" was jointly signed. Then in 1999, the Ministry of the Interior (Taiwan) officially announced the "Anniversary of the Buddha's Birthday (Chinese: 佛陀誕辰紀念日 Fótuó Dànchén Jìniàn Rì)" in the "Guódìng Jìniàn Rì (Chinese: 國定紀念日, "National Memorial Day")". Buddha's birthday is a national holiday. Devotees pour fragrant water over Buddha statues to symbolise the beginning of a fresh start in life.

Thailand
In Thailand, Buddha's birthday is celebrated as Visakha Puja and is a public holiday. People gather at temples to hear sermons, give donations and chant prayers.

Vietnam
In Vietnam, Buddha's birthday is called in Vietnamese, "Lễ Phật Đản/ Phật Đản (佛誕, "Birthday of the Buddha"), or "Ngày Hội Hoa Phật" (Buddha's Lord Flower Festival Day)" and is celebrated throughout Vietnam. Many Buddhist temples hold celebrations that attract people from around the country, while pagodas around the country are decorated. From 1958 to 1975, the birthday of Buddha (on the 8th day of the 4th month in the Lunar calendar) was recognized as a national public holiday in South Vietnam, enjoyed with floats and lantern parades on the streets. Currently Buddha's Birthday is still a popular celebrated festival in Vietnam, but not a public holiday.

Outside Asia

Australia
In Sydney, Buddha's birthday is celebrated at the Nan Tien Temple in Wollongong, while another celebration also organised by Nan Tien Temple is held at Darling Harbour, which features Buddha's birthday ceremony. A variety of vegetarian food is served, and culture stalls and multicultural performances are held, celebrating cultures from China, Japan, Vietnam, Korea, India, Malaysia, Sri Lanka, Australia. Other temples in the Fo Guang Shan Nan Tien Temple group in Australia also hld celebrations on the eighth day of the fourth month of the China lunar calendar. In Brisbane, the Buddha's Birthday Festival is held annually and features a variety of pan-Asian food, and performances from various cultures are held. It is a weekend-long festival which draws over 200000 visitors. In Melbourne, the weekend-long festival called Buddha's Day and Multicultural Festival is held at Federation Square around April/May. In Perth, a two-day celebration also known as Buddha's Day and Multicultural Festival is held at Langley Park. Local Buddhist temples and smaller towns around the country such as Bendigo, Victoria also hold celebrations.

On the Australian external territory of Christmas Island, Buddha's Birthday is celebrated as "Vesak Day" and is celebrated alongside many other celebrations common in Australia and Malaysia as well as local celebrations of the island.

Brazil
Vesak (Hanamatsuri) is widely known and celebrated in Brazil due to the country's large Japanese community. Hanamatsuri has grown in popularity and also attracts interest from the wider non-Japanese Brazilian population. As a result, Hanamatsuri has become a consumerist culture phenomenon in the country and is sometimes locally known as Festa das Flores. Hanamatsuri is celebrated in the São Paulo neighbourhood of Liberdade which is home to the largest Japanese community outside of Japan. Hanamatsuri celebrations in Liberdade began in 1966 and includes a parade on Galvão Bueno street.  Celebrations are also held at the suburb's major shopping centre, Liberdade Plaza.

Canada
In Toronto, three Buddhist temples representing the three main branches of Buddhism organize an annual event known as Vesak: Buddha's Birthday. It is held at Mississauga Celebration Square, and features a number of Buddhist-themed events and activities, as well as cultural acts from Asia, including China, Sri Lanka and Vietnam.

United States
The celebration of Buddha's Birthday in the United States differs from community to community, depending on ethnicity and nationality.

The Japanese celebration on 8 April has been significant in the Bay Area of California for some decades. In 1968 the first circumambulation of Mt. Tamalpais to celebrate Buddha's Birthday was conducted. Starting in 1969 at Tassajara Zen Mountain Center, Hana-Matsuri (花ーまつり - flower festival) was celebrated each spring. Dressed in formal black robes, the roughly 70 monks and students form a formal procession to the Horse Pasture with the leader periodically ringing a small, clear bell. A temporary stone altar was built under a huge oak tree in a gorgeous field of green grass and abundant wildflowers; a small statue of a baby Buddha was placed upon it in a metal basin. Then each person, in turn, approaches the altar, and ladle one thin-lipped bamboo dipperful of sweet green tea over the statue, bow, and walk to one side.

In New York, the International Lotus Lantern Parade has been a notable and successful annual event held at Union Square Park. The event celebrates the Buddha's birthday and Yeon Deung Hoe (연등회,燃燈會), a Korean lantern celebration that is held during Vesak. The festival features a number of Buddhist themed events and is started off by numerous Buddhist centres of Japanese, Korean and Sri Lankan origins for example.

Since 1963, the state of Hawaii has recognized April 8 of each year as "Buddha Day", which celebrates the birth of Siddhartha Gautama, the founder of Buddhism.

See also
 
 Bun Festival – a festival held on the same day in Hong Kong.
 Hanami
 Holidays in Taiwan
 Holidays in Vietnam
 Holidays of Japan
 List of Buddhist festivals 
 List of festivals in Asia 
 Public holidays in Bangladesh
 Public holidays in Bhutan
 Public holidays in India
 Public holidays in Macau
 Public holidays in Nepal
 Public holidays in North Korea
 Public holidays in the Philippines
 Public holidays in South Korea
 Public holidays in Sri Lanka

References

Further reading
 The Folkloric Study of Chopail (Buddha's Birthday), written by Prof. M.Y.Pyeon. Produced by Minsokwon in Seoul Korea 2002.

External links

 Buddha Jayanti About Buddha Jayanti
 Buddha's Birthday बुद्ध जयन्ती Buddha's Birthday बुद्ध जयन्ती

Buddhist holidays
Buddhist festivals
Public holidays in Hong Kong
Public holidays in Nepal
Public holidays in South Korea
April observances
May observances
Birthdays
Religious festivals in Nepal
Festivals in Korea
Religious festivals in South Korea
Observances set by the Chinese calendar
Observances on non-Gregorian calendars
Religious festivals in Asia
Observances set by the Burmese calendar
Buddhism in Korea
Buddhism in China
Observances held on the full moon
Gautama Buddha